Robert Dashwood  may refer to:

Sir Robert Dashwood, 1st Baronet, MP for Banbury
Sir Robert Dashwood, 9th Baronet
Sir Robert Henry Seymour Dashwood, 7th Baronet (1876–1947), of the Dashwood baronets

See also
Dashwood